Charlie may refer to:

Characters
 "Charlie," the head of the Townsend Agency', from the Charlie's Angels franchise
 Charlie, a character on signs for the CharlieCard, a smart card issued by the Massachusetts Bay Transportation Authority
 Charlie, mascot of British restaurant Little Chef
 Charlie Dompler, main character from animated series Smiling Friends

Film and television
 Charlie (2015 Malayalam film), an Indian Malayalam-language film
 Charlie (2015 Kannada film), an Indian Kannada-language film
 Charlie (TV series), a 2015 political drama series based on the life of Charles J. Haughey
 "Charlie", a 2004 episode of the television series The Mighty Boosh
 777 Charlie, a 2022 Indian Kannada-language film

Military
 Charlie-class submarine, of the Soviet Navy
 "Charlie", American military slang referring to the Viet Cong and North Vietnamese soldiers
 "Charlie", the letter "C" in the NATO phonetic alphabet

Music
 Charlie (band), a British rock band in the 1970s and 1980s
 Charlie (Charlie Puth album), a 2022 album by Charlie Puth
 Charlie (Melt-Banana album), a 1998 album by the band Melt-Banana
 "Charlie" (Red Hot Chili Peppers song), 2006
 "Charlie", a song by Miranda Cosgrove on her debut album Sparks Fly, 2010
 "Charlie", a song by Alice Ivy on the album I'm Dreaming, 2018
 "Charlie" (Mallrat song), 2019
 "Charlie" (Tones and I song), 2022
 "Charlie", a song by Lana Scolaro, 2020

People
 Charlie (given name), a nickname for Charles, Charlotte, or Charlene
 Charlie (Hungarian singer) (born 1947), Hungarian rock and soul singer born Károly Horváth in 1947
 Charlie (skeleton), a Neolithic skeleton discovered in England
 Charlie Chop-off, the pseudonym given to an unidentified American serial killer

Places
 Charlie, Texas, an unincorporated community in Clay County
 Charlie Creek (Florida), a stream

Animals
 Charlie (elephant) (died 1923), circus and movies
 Charlie (parrot) (born 1899), a pet possibly owned by Winston Churchill

Other uses
 Charlie (fragrance), a line of women's and men's fragrances
 Charlie Hebdo (Charlie Weekly), a French satirical weekly newspaper, sometimes shortened to Charlie
 Charlie Mensuel (Charlie Monthly), a French monthly comics magazine
 Cocaine, a drug sometimes referred to by the street name "Charlie"
 Charles S. Roberts Award, nicknamed Charlie, an award in war gaming
 Brownlow Medal of the Australian Football League, nicknamed "Charlie"

See also

 La Trobe University, nicknamed "Old Charlie"
 Charles (disambiguation)
 Charley (disambiguation)
 Charli (disambiguation)
 Charline (name)
 Charly (disambiguation)
 Chuck (disambiguation)